Isaac Moreno Alcántara (born July 25, 1982) is a Mexican football manager and former player. He was born in Mexico City.

References

1982 births
Living people
Association football midfielders
Atlético Mexiquense footballers
Club Celaya footballers
Ascenso MX players
Footballers from Mexico City
Mexican footballers